Ubocze may refer to the following places in Poland:
Ubocze, Lower Silesian Voivodeship (south-west Poland)
Ubocze, West Pomeranian Voivodeship (north-west Poland)